Emmanuel Celeste Trance (born August 18, 1953) is a Filipino bishop of the Roman Catholic Church. Since 2005, he is the second and current Bishop of Catarman.

Ministry

He was ordained on May 17, 1978, and incardinated in the Archdiocese of Jaro. After several years of pastoral practice, he became involved with the seminary in Iloilo, where he was, among others, librarian, vice-rector and rector.

On May 14, 2004, Pope John Paul II appointed him Coadjutor Bishop of Catarman. He was consecrated a bishop on July 22, 2004, by Archbishop Antonio Franco. On March 10, 2005, he assumed full rule in the diocese.

References

External links
Emmanuel Trance at Catholic Hierarchy

1953 births
Living people
20th-century Roman Catholic bishops in the Philippines
21st-century Roman Catholic bishops in the Philippines
People from Iloilo
Bishops appointed by Pope John Paul II